Buch (the German word for book or a modification of the German word Buche for beech) may refer to:

People
 Buch (surname), a list of people with the surname Buch

Geography
Germany
Buch am Wald, a town in the district of Ansbach, Bavaria
Buch am Buchrain, a town in the district of Erding, Bavaria
Buch am Erlbach, a town in the district of Landshut, Bavaria
Buch, Swabia, a town in the district of Neu-Ulm, Bavaria
Buch, Rhein-Hunsrück, in the Rhein-Hunsrück district, Rhineland-Palatinate
Buch, Rhein-Lahn, in the Rhein-Lahn district, Rhineland-Palatinate
Buch, Saxony-Anhalt, a town in the district of Stendal in Saxony-Anhalt
Buch (Berlin), a locality in Pankow district, Berlin
Buoch, in the municipality of Remshalden
Pouch, Germany, a village in Saxony-Anhalt
Das Buch (de) a mountain near Lindenfels
Austria
 Buch, Austria, a town in the district of Bregenz in Vorarlberg
 Puch bei Hallein, a municipality in the Hallein District

Switzerland
Buch, Schaffhausen, a municipality in the canton of Schaffhausen
Buch am Irchel, a municipality in the canton of Zurich
Buch (Wiesendangen), a place in the municipality of Wiesendangen, canton of Zurich
Buch bei Frauenfeld (until 1953 Buch bei Uesslingen), part of the municipality Uesslingen-Buch, Thurgau
Buch bei Happerswil (Happerswil-Buch), part of the municipality of Birwinken, Thurgau
Buch bei Märwil (until 1953 Buch bei Affeltrangen), part of the municipality of Affeltrangen, Thurgau
Buch bei Mühleberg, part of the municipality of Mühleberg, Canton of Berne

France
Buch, Aquitaine, a port and town on Arcachon Bay, the seat of a former lordship

United States
Buch, Kentucky

Astronomy
 Buch (crater), a crater on the moon

Music
Das Buch (Puhdys album)

See also
 Captal de Buch
 Jean III de Grailly, captal de Buch
 Bucha (disambiguation)